The Guaduinae is a subtribe of bamboo (tribe Bambuseae of the family Poaceae). It comprises 5 recognized genera.

References

Bambusoideae
Plant subtribes